Armaan Malik (born 22 July 1995) is an Indian singer, songwriter, record producer, voice-over, performer, dancer and actor. He is known for his singing in multiple languages, including Hindi, Telugu, English, Bengali, Kannada, Marathi, Tamil, Gujarati, Punjabi, Urdu and Malayalam. In 2006, he took part in Sa Re Ga Ma Pa L'il Champs but was eliminated after finishing in 8th position. He is the brother of music composer Amaal Mallik. Previously represented by Universal Music India and T-Series, he is now represented by Warner Music India and Arista Records. He has his own record label called Always Music Global in partnership with Warner Music India. His first on-screen appearance was in the film Kaccha Limboo in 2011.

Early life 
Armaan Malik was born in Mumbai on 22 July 1995, to a Muslim father and a Hindu mother.

Career

Malik started singing at the age of 4. He competed on Sa Re Ga Ma Pa L'il Champs in 2006, eventually finishing 8th. Later he learnt Indian classical music for 10 years. Malik made his debut as a child singer in Bollywood in 2007 with "Bum Bum Bole" in Taare Zameen Par, under the musical direction of the Shankar-Ehsaan-Loy.

Malik has dubbed for My Name Is Khan for the English boy and also lent voice for the character Salim in the radio version of Slumdog Millionaire for BBC Radio 1. In 2014, he made his debut as a playback singer singing "Tumko Toh Aana Hi Tha" in the Hindi-language movie Jai Ho. The movie featured two more songs, "Love You Till The End (House Mix)" and the title track, "Jai Ho" also sung by him. Apart from singing, Malik and his music composer brother Amaal Mallik also featured in the beginning of Jai Ho in the song "Love You Till The End". In the same year, he sang "Naina" with Sona Mohapatra for the film Khoobsurat and "Auliya" for Ungli.

In 2015, he sang "Main Hoon Hero Tera" for Hero, "Kwahishein" for Calendar Girls and "Tumhe Aapna Banane Ka" for Hate Story 3 which his brother Amaal Malik composed. The latter one he sang with Neeti Mohan. He also sang another song for Hate Story 3 titled "Wajah Tum Ho" under Baman's composition. He sang "Yaar Indha Muyalkutti" by D Imaan. He also sang a single "Main Rahoon Ya Na Rahoon" under Amaal's composition. He was awarded Filmfare R. D. Burman Award for New Music Talent in that year.

In 2016, Malik sang for the films Mastizaade, Sanam Re, Kapoor & Sons, Azhar, Do Lafzon Ki Kahani and "Sab Tera" with Shraddha Kapoor for Baaghi under Amaal's composition. He sang "Foolishq" with Shreya Ghoshal for Ki & Ka, he worked with Jeet Gannguli for the song "Mujhko Barsaat Bana Lo" for Junooniyat and also sang his first Bengali song "Dhitang Dhitang" for Love Express under Jeet's composition. He was the lead singer of the film M.S. Dhoni: The Untold Story. He sang four songs for Hindi soundtrack and three songs for Tamil soundtrack of that film under Amaal's composition. He sang "Sau Asmaan" with Neeti Mohan for Baar Baar Dekho and "Ishaara" for Force 2 under Amaal's composition. He sang "Tum Jo Mille" for Saansein, "Pal Pal Dil Ke Paas Reprise" and "Dil Mein Chupa Lunga Remake" for Wajah Tum Ho. The latter one was composed by Meet Bros and the last two songs, he sang with Tulsi Kumar. He sang a single "Pyaar Manga Hain Remake" with Neeti Mohan. He also sang the title track of Star Paarivar Awards 2016 with Palak Muchhal and Meet Bros under Meet Bros composition.

In 2019, he lent his voice for two songs including "Jab Se Mera Dil"  with Palak Muchhal for the movie Amavas, "Dil Me Ho Tum" for the movie Why Cheat India, "Kyun Rabba" for the movie Badla. Malik also got featured as a coach on the Indian version of the reality show The Voice becoming the youngest Indian singer to be a coach on the show. He sang "Chale Aana" in De De Pyaar De composed by Amaal and written by Kunaal Verma. The song was well received by the audience in general. Malik voiced the titular character in the Hindi-dubbed version of Disney's Aladdin, a live action remake of the 1992 movie, Aladdin.

Malik has also voiced Mena Massoud as Aladdin, in the Hindi version of the American musical fantasy Aladdin. In addition, he has also sung the songs in Hindi for the film The Lion King. He also sang for the film Kabir Singh, under the composer Vishal Mishra for the song "Pehla Pyaar". In same year, he sang two songs for Yeh Saali Aashiqui, one for films like Article 15, Pranaam, Pati Patni Aur Woh and Hindi soundtrack of Pailwaan.

Malik signed with Arista Records on 12 March 2020, under which he released his first English-language single, "Control" on 20 March of the same year. "Control" won the Best Indian Act at the 2020 MTV Europe Music Awards, and was later certified platinum in India.

In 2020, Malik became the first artist to hit No. 1 on the Top Triller Global Billboard charts twice. Just a few weeks later, he released his second English single, "How Many," which celebrates his heritage by using an Indian tabla on the beat. He said it was "quite daunting to re-introduce" himself to the global music industry as he started making songs in English, and believes that more Indian artists will push themselves to worldwide success in the future.
 
In 2020, he sang one song for Hindi soundtrack of Darbar, Gunjan Saxena: The Kargil Girl and Khuda Haafiz. In 2021, he lent his voice for one track of Saina, Koi Jaane Na, 99 Songs, Bell Bottom, Thalaivii, Bhoot Police and Velle.

He was featured on the A. R. Rahman single "Meri Pukaar Suno", released in June 2021, which was sung by an ensemble that included K.S.Chithra, Sadhana Sargam, Shreya Ghoshal , Asees Kaur, Shaasha Tirupati  and Alka Yagnik. 
In September 2021, Malik teamed up with Daboo Malik, Amaal Mallik and Kunaal Vermaa for his new single "Barsaat".

In 2022, Malik teamed up with Arista Records for his new English single "You". He lent his voice for films like Bhool Bhulaiyaa 2, Major, Ardh. He released his Hindi single "Nakhrey Nakhrey" and "Rehna Tere Paas". He was also featured on a remix of the Ed Sheeran song 2step (song), which released on June 7, 2022. Malik won the Best India Act at the 2022 MTV Europe Music Awards for his single, "You".

Television

2006: Sa Re Ga Ma Pa L'il Champs, as a contestant.
2012: The Suite Life of Karan & Kabir (Season-1 Episode-22), as Zafar Ali
2015: Indian Idol Junior 2 as a guest.
2016: The Kapil Sharma Show (season 1, episode-15), as guest
2016: Sa Re Ga Ma Pa, as a guest.
2017: The Drama Company (episode 23rd), as a guest.
2019: No. 1 Yaari Jam (episode-2), as a guest.
2019: The Voice, as a judge.
2019: By invite only (episode 42) as a guest.
2019: The Kapil Sharma Show (season 2, episode-56), as guest
2020: Jammin season 3 as a guest.
2020: The Love Laugh Live Show S2 as a guest. 
2021: UnacademyUnwind with MTV as a guest.
2022: Ravivaar With Star Parivaar as host

Awards and nominations

Discography

Studio Albums
 Armaan (2014)
 MTV Unplugged Season 7 (2018)

References

External links

1995 births
Filmi singers
Living people
Berklee College of Music alumni
Indian male singers
Singers from Mumbai
Bollywood playback singers
Sa Re Ga Ma Pa participants
Indian child singers
Indian singer-songwriters